This is a list of schools in Central Bedfordshire, a unitary authority in the English county of Bedfordshire.

State-funded schools

Primary and lower schools

Ardley Hill Academy, Dunstable
Ashton St Peters CE Primary School, Dunstable
Aspley Guise Lower School, Aspley Guise
Beaudesert Lower School, Leighton Buzzard
Beecroft Academy, Dunstable
Biggleswade Academy, Biggleswade
Caddington Village School, Caddington
Caldecote CE Academy, Upper Caldecote 
Campton Academy, Campton
Chalton Lower School, Chalton
Clifton All Saints Academy Clifton
Clipstone Brook Lower School, Leighton Buzzard
Cranfield CE Academy, Cranfield
Derwent Lower School, Henlow
Dovery Academy, Leighton Buzzard
Dunstable Icknield Lower School, Dunstable
Dunton CE Lower School, Dunton
Eaton Bray Academy, Eaton Bray
Eversholt Lower School, Eversholt
Everton Heath Primary School, Everton
Fairfield Park Lower School, Fairfield
The Firs Lower School, Ampthill
Flitwick Lower School, Flitwick
Gothic Mede Academy, Arlesey
Gravenhurst Academy, Gravenhurst
Greenfield and Pulloxhill Academy, Greenfield/Pulloxhill
Greenleas School, Leighton Buzzard
Hadrian Academy, Dunstable
Harlington Lower School, Harlington
Hawthorn Park Community Primary, Houghton Regis
Haynes Lower School, Haynes
Heathwood Lower School, Leighton Buzzard
Hockliffe Lower School, Hockliffe
Houghton Conquest Lower School, Houghton Conquest
Houghton Regis Primary School, Houghton Regis
Husborne Crawley Lower School, Husborne Crawley
John Donne CE Primary School, Blunham
Kensworth CE Academy, Kensworth
Kingsmoor Lower School, Flitwick
Laburnum Primary School, Sandy
Lancot School, Dunstable
Langford Village Academy, Langford
Lark Rise Academy, Dunstable
Lawnside Academy, Biggleswade
Leedon Lower School, Leedon
Linslade Lower School, Linslade
Maple Tree Primary School, Sandy
Marston Moreteyne School, Marston Moreteyne
The Mary Bassett Lower School, Leighton Buzzard
Maulden Lower School, Maulden
Meppershall CE Academy, Meppershall
Moggerhanger Primary School, Moggerhanger
Northill CE Academy, Northill
Potton Lower School, Potton
Pulford CE Lower School, Leighton Buzzard
Ramsey Manor Lower School, Barton-le-Clay
Raynsford CE Academy, Henlow
Ridgmont Lower School, Ridgmont
Robert Peel Primary School, Sandy
Roecroft Lower School, Stotfold
The Rushmere Park Academy, Leighton Buzzard
Russell Lower School, Ampthill
St Andrew's CE Lower School, Biggleswade
St Augustine's Academy, Dunstable
St Christopher's Academy, Dunstable
St Leonard's VA Lower School, Heath and Reach
St Mary's CE Academy, Stotfold
St Mary's CE Lower School, Clophill
St Mary's RC Primary School, Caddington
St Swithun's CE Primary School, Sandy
St Vincent's RC Primary School, Houghton Regis
Shefford Lower School, Shefford
Shelton Lower School, Lower Shelton
Shillington Lower School, Shillington
Silsoe CE Lower School, Silsoe
Slip End Village School, Slip End
Southcott Lower School, Linslade
Southill Lower School, Southill
Stanbridge Lower School, Stanbridge
Stondon Lower School, Stondon
Studham Village CE Academy, Studham
Sundon Lower School, Sundon
Sutton CE Lower School, Sutton
Swallowfield Lower School, Woburn Sands
Templefield Lower School, Flitwick
Thomas Johnson Lower School, Lidlington 
Thomas Whitehead CE Academy, Houghton Regis
Thornhill Primary School, Houghton Regis
Tithe Farm Primary School, Houghton Regis
Toddington St George CE School, Toddington
Totternhoe CE Academy, Totternhoe
The Vale Academy, Dunstable
Watling Lower School, Dunstable
Westoning Lower School, Westoning
Woburn Lower School, Woburn
Wrestlingworth CE Lower School, Wrestlingworth

Middle schools

Alameda Middle School, Ampthill
Arnold Academy, Barton-le-Clay
Biggleswade Academy, Biggleswade
Brooklands Middle School, Leighton Buzzard
Edward Peake VC CE Middle School, Biggleswade
Etonbury Academy, Arlesey
Fulbrook Middle School, Woburn Sands
Gilbert Inglefield Academy, Leighton Buzzard
Henlow CE Academy, Henlow
Holywell Middle School, Cranfield
Leighton Middle School, Leighton Buzzard
Linslade School, Linslade
Parkfields Middle School, Toddington
Pix Brook Academy, Stotfold
Potton Middle School, Potton
Priory Academy, Dunstable
Robert Bloomfield Academy, Shefford
Woodland Middle School Academy, Flitwick

Secondary and upper schools

All Saints Academy, Dunstable
Cedars Upper School, Leighton Buzzard
Etonbury Academy, Arlesey
Harlington Upper School, Harlington
Houstone School, Houghton Regis
Manshead CE Academy, Caddington
Queensbury Academy, Dunstable
Redborne Upper School and Community College, Ampthill
Samuel Whitbread Academy, Shefford
Sandy Secondary School, Sandy
Stratton Upper School, Biggleswade
Pix Brook Academy, Stotfold
Priory Academy, Dunstable
Vandyke Upper School, Leighton Buzzard

Special and alternative schools
The Academy of Central Bedfordshire, Houghton Regis
The Chiltern School, Dunstable/Houghton Regis
Ivel Valley School, Biggleswade
Oak Bank School, Leighton Buzzard
Weatherfield Academy, Dunstable

Further education
Central Bedfordshire College
Shuttleworth College

Independent schools

Primary and preparatory schools
Orchard School and Nursery, Barton-le-Clay

Senior and all-through schools
OneSchool Global UK, Biggleswade
OneSchool Global UK, Dunstable

Special and alternative schools
Esland Bedford School, Silsoe

Schools in Central Bedfordshire District
Central Bedfordshire
Lists of buildings and structures in Bedfordshire